Tal is an Afro-Asiatic language spoken in Plateau State, Nigeria. Tal is spoken in a cluster of 53 villages located east of the Panyam-Shendam road. There are 6 dialects of Tal, namely Bongmuut, Buzuk, Nbaal, Muɗak, Muɗong, and Takong.

Notes

Further reading 
Blench, Roger. 2017. Ethnozoology of the Tal, Chadic-speakers of west-central Nigeria.

Languages of Nigeria
West Chadic languages